St Andrew's Church is in Meols Drive, West Kirby, Wirral, Merseyside, England. It is an active Anglican parish church in the diocese of Chester, the archdeaconry of Chester, and the deanery of Wirral North. The church is recorded in the National Heritage List for England as a designated Grade II listed building.

History

This was originally from 1891 a chapel of ease to St Bridget's Church and became a separate parish in 1920. Building of the church began in 1889–91 by Douglas and Fordham and was completed in 1907–09 by Douglas and Minshull.

Present day
The parish stands in the Traditional Catholic tradition of the Church of England. As it rejects the ordination of women, it receives alternative episcopal oversight from the Bishop of Beverley (currently Stephen Race).

Architecture

Exterior
The church is built in snecked sandstone with ashlar dressings and has a slate roof. It is cruciform in shape, and its plan consists of a five-bay nave, with a clerestory, north and south aisles, a crossing, north and south transepts, and a chancel. Above the crossing is a tower which is set diagonally on which is a slate-hung spire and four slate-hung pinnacles. The south transept forms a chapel and the north transept holds the organ chamber. At the west end is a four-light window and at the east end a five-light window flanked by niches containing statues. The chancel has embattled parapets.

Interior
The columns of the arcade are octagonal. The font is also octagonal and it has a timber cover with crocketed pinnacles. In the crossing are the choirstalls, and the chapel to the south has a parclose screen. On the south wall of the chancel are a piscina and a sedilia. The reredos is by Geoffrey Webb, is dated 1911, and contains canopied figures. It is painted and gilded, and described by the authors of the Buildings of England series as "magnificent". In 1928 Arthur Barbosa designed the organ case, pew fronts and six-foot candlesticks. At the west end of the church, dating from 1952, is a canopy forming a baptistry. The stained glass in the south transept, the north aisle and the east window is by Herbert Bryams, a pupil of Kempe. There are also two windows dating from the 1990s by Septimus Waugh.

See also

Listed buildings in Hoylake
List of new churches by John Douglas

References

External links
St Andrew's West Kirby Website

Further reading

19th-century Church of England church buildings
Churches completed in 1909
Churches in the Metropolitan Borough of Wirral
Church of England church buildings in Merseyside
Grade II listed churches in Merseyside
Gothic Revival church buildings in England
Gothic Revival architecture in Merseyside
John Douglas buildings
Diocese of Chester
Anglo-Catholic church buildings in Merseyside
West Kirby